Robert Brian Mountain (born 11 September 1956) is an English former professional footballer born in Wombwell, Yorkshire, who played in the Football League for Huddersfield Town in the 1970s. Mountain went on to play non-league football for Frickley Colliery, Mexborough Town, Bridlington Trinity, Grantham Town, for whom he scored 15 goals from 39 games in all competitions, Alfreton Town, with 47 goals from 82 games in all competitions, Matlock Town, with whom he was Northern Premier League leading scorer in the 1982–83 season, and Stafford Rangers, for whom he scored the winning goal in the Conference League Cup in 1985–86.

References

1956 births
Living people
People from Wombwell
Sportspeople from Yorkshire
English footballers
Association football forwards
Huddersfield Town A.F.C. players
Frickley Athletic F.C. players
Mexborough Town F.C. players
Bridlington Trinity F.C. players
Grantham Town F.C. players
Alfreton Town F.C. players
Matlock Town F.C. players
Stafford Rangers F.C. players
English Football League players
Northern Premier League players
National League (English football) players